Nora Denney (September 3, 1927 – November 20, 2005), also credited as Dodo Denney, was an American actress.

Career
Her show business career began in Kansas City when she was hired by the local television station Channel 5 (KCMO TV) to play "Marilyn the Witch", an onscreen host for horror movies. She performed in many television series, including Green Acres, Petticoat Junction, Bewitched, Hart to Hart, Get Smart, Room 222 and That Girl.

Her film credits include Who's Minding the Mint? (1967), I Walk the Line (1970), Do Not Fold, Spindle or Mutilate (1971), I Wonder Who's Killing Her Now? (1975), American Hot Wax (1978) and Truman (1995). She made her final film appearance in 1999 in Ang Lee's Ride with the Devil. She played school teacher "Mrs. Teavee" in Willy Wonka & the Chocolate Factory (1971), and appeared in Splash (1984).

Personal life and later years
She was married to Alan Denney, an art director and illustrator for Hallmark Greeting Cards. While the couple raised their two sons, Dix and John, founders of the Los Angeles-based punk rock band The Weirdos, she became a film and television character actress. Denney died of cancer on November 20, 2005, aged 78.

Filmography

References

External links
 
 
 

1927 births
2005 deaths
20th-century American actresses
Actresses from Kansas City, Missouri
American film actresses
American stage actresses
American television actresses
Deaths from cancer in California
21st-century American women